A philanthropist is someone who engages in philanthropy; donating their time, money, and/or reputation to charitable causes. The term may apply to any volunteer or to anyone who makes a donation, but the label is most often applied to those who donate large sums of money or who make a major impact through their volunteering, such as a trustee who manages a philanthropic organization or one who establishes and funds a foundation.

A philanthropist may not always find universal approval for their deeds. Common accusations include supporting an unworthy cause (such as funding art instead of fighting world hunger) or having selfish motivation at heart (such as avoiding taxes or attaining personal fame). A philanthropist is also someone who cares for someone else's needs instead of their own.

Notable philanthropists
 Abdul Rahman Al-Sumait – founder of Direct Aid, a charity organization.
 Abdul Sattar Edhi – co-head of the Edhi Foundation in Pakistan
 Achyuta Samanta – founder of the Kalinga Institute of Social Sciences (KISS)
 Adar Poonawalla – In 2016, he was listed by GQ Magazine and awarded Philanthropist of the year.
 Ailsa Mellon-Bruce – co-founder of the Andrew W. Mellon Foundation
Alisher Usmanov – business-magnate, philanthropist, FIE President, founder of Art, science and sport foundation
 Alagappa Chettiar – notable for work on Indian education
 Anne-Françoise de Fougeret (1745-1813) – French philanthropist
 Alfred Nobel – founder of the Nobel Prizes
 Alicia Keys – American singer/songwriter; spokeswoman for Keep A Child Alive
 Amal Hijazi – Lebanese singer, known for her philanthropy
 Amjad Saqib, a Pakistani social entrepreneur, development practitioner, as well as, founder and Executive Director of Akhuwat Foundation, which is the world's largest Islamic microfinance organization that provides interest-free loans to the most deserving segments of society.
 Andrew Carnegie – founder of the Carnegie Corporation of New York, Carnegie Endowment for International Peace, Carnegie Foundation for the Advancement of Teaching, Carnegie Institution for Science, Carnegie Trust for the Universities of Scotland, Carnegie Hero Fund, Carnegie United Kingdom Trust, Carnegie Council for Ethics in International Affairs, Carnegie Mellon University, and the Carnegie Museums of Pittsburgh. He also donated money to build over 2500 public libraries worldwide, the Carnegie Hall in New York, and the Peace Palace at The Hague
 Angelina Jolie – American actress; known for her humanitarian work worldwide; a Goodwill Ambassador for the UN Refugee Agency
 Annie Rensselaer Tinker - volunteer nurse in WWI and suffragist, formed the Annie R. Tinker Memorial Fund nonprofit organization
 Ansar Burney - a Pakistani human and civil rights activist and chairman of Ansar Burney Trust International
 Anthony Ashley Cooper, 7th Earl of Shaftesbury – chairman of the Ragged Schools Union (during the Victorian era)
 Anthony J. Drexel – founder of Drexel University
 Arpad Busson – founder of Ark (Absolute Return for Kids) Academy
 Azim Premji – founder of Azim Premji Foundation, donated $21 billion towards education 
 Belinda Stronach – co-founder of Spread the Net
 Ben Delo – took The Giving Pledge
 Bill Ackman – in 2011, the Ackmans were among The Chronicle of Philanthropys "Philanthropy 50" list of the most generous donors
 Bill Gates – co-founder of the Bill & Melinda Gates Foundation
 Bilquis Edhi – co-head of the Edhi Foundation in Pakistan
 Bono – one of the world's best-known philanthropic performers; named the most politically effective celebrity of all time by the National Journal
 Calouste Gulbenkian – patron of churches, education and medicine, founder of the Calouste Gulbenkian Foundation
 Cari Tuna – co-founder Good Ventures
Carlos Slim Helu – investor, telecom tycoon, founder of the Carlos Slim Foundation
 Catherine T. MacArthur – co-founder of the MacArthur Foundation
 Charles Garland – gave up most of his family inheritance in 1922 in order to establish the Garland Fund to promote radical charitable causes
 Charles Pratt – founder of Pratt Institute
 Charles Simonyi – founder of Charles and Lisa Simonyi Fund for Arts and Sciences, $100 million
 Chris Hohn – Founder and Chair of The Children's Investment Fund Foundation
 Chris Martin – lead singer of British alternative rock band Coldplay; known for supporting the Make Trade Fair campaign; he and his band contribute 15% of their money to charity
 Christopher Reeve – founder of the Christopher and Dana Reeve Foundation
 Chuck Feeney – founder of Atlantic Philanthropies
 Cornelius Vanderbilt – founder of the Vanderbilt University
 Dame Shirley Porter – Tesco heiress; co-founder of The Porter Foundation; has donated to Tel Aviv University, social welfare facilities and ecological funding, the National Portrait Gallery in London
 David Bohnett – founder of the David Bohnett Foundation supporting a wide range of social issues including LGBT rights
 David Gilmour – singer and guitarist of Pink Floyd; was made CBE for his years of philanthropy; amongst other things, Gilmour gave $21.5 million from the auctioning of his guitars to climate change charity ClientEarth and  $7.5 million from sale of his London home to the homeless charity Crisis
 David Koch – founder of the David H. Koch Charitable Foundation; listed by The Chronicle of Philanthropy as one of the world's top 50 philanthropists in 2013
 Demi Lovato – provides the Lovato Treatment Scholarship; supporter of 13 different charity organization; an official Ambassador for the youth empowerment event We Day and the organization Free the Children
 Đorđe Vajfert – patron of humanitarian and cultural institutions and donor to the University of Belgrade
 Dolly Parton – country singer; advocate for children's education through her foundation, the Imagination Library, which gives books to children to develop their reading skills before starting school.
 Don Ball – co-founder of Ballhomes, founder of Hope Center
 Donald Rix – BC Innovation Council, BC Cancer Agency Foundation, BC Medical Services Foundation, and the BC Children’s Hospital Foundation
 Dr. Mo Ibrahim – founder of telecom company Celtel International; set up the Mo Ibrahim Foundation to encourage better governance in Africa, and providing higher education scholarships for leadership and management for Africans; initiated the Mo Ibrahim Prize for Achievement in African Leadership
 Dustin Moskovitz – co-founder Good Ventures
 Edward Harkness – various private colleges and boarding schools; medical facilities; Commonwealth Fund
 Elinor Sauerwein – Salvation Army philanthropist
 Ellen Gates Starr – founder of the biomedical institute that bears his name Hull House
 Elon Musk – chairman of the Musk Foundation
 Elton John – has raised more than US$125 million just for the Elton John AIDS Foundation. In 2004 he donated over US$43 million to organizations around the world, making him the most generous person in music for that year, "a title he retains year after year." In 1997 he raised US$40 million for charity through sales of the single "Candle in the Wind 1997". He currently supports at least 57 charities.
 Enriqueta Augustina Rylands – founder of the John Rylands Library
 Eric Schmidt and Wendy Schmidt: The Schmidt Family Foundation, Schmidt Ocean Institute and Schmidt Futures
 Fazle Hasan Abed – founder of BRAC
 Frank F Islam – information technology entrepreneur, working to improve education system. $2 million invested in Aligarh Muslim University for a separate business school.
 Gary Sinise – co-founder of Operation Iraqi Children
 Gautam Adani – Adani is the owner of the Adani Foundation, funded through the Adani Group. It was founded in 1996. Other than Gujarat, the organisation operates in the states of Maharashtra, Rajasthan, Himachal Pradesh, Madhya Pradesh, Chhattisgarh, and Odisha.
 George Clooney – known for humanitarian work in aiding the Darfur conflict, organizing Hope for Haiti Now, and involvement in Not On Our Watch 
 George Peabody – founder of numerous charitable institutions in the United States and United Kingdom
 George Soros – estimated to have donated more than US$32 billion, often through the Open Society Institute and Soros Foundations
 Godwin Maduka – doctor and founder of Las Vegas Pain Institute and Medical Center
Hansjörg Wyss – businessman, founder of a medical research and design company Synthes and the Wyss Foundation
 Henry Ford – co-founder of the Ford Foundation
 Henry W. Bloch – founder of H&R Block Tax company. Henry established the nationally acclaimed Marion Bloch Neuroscience Institute, formed the Marion and Henry Bloch Family Foundation one of the largest family foundations in the region (Midwest) and many other places in the Kansas City community
 Hilmar Reksten – Norwegian shipping magnate, tax evader, patron of the arts
 Holden Karnofsky – co-founder and board member of the charity evaluator GiveWell and the executive director of the Open Philanthropy Project
 Howard Ahmanson, Jr. – multi-millionaire philanthropist and financier of the causes of many conservative Christian cultural, religious and political organizations
 Howard Hughes – aviator, engineer, industrialist and film producer; donated US$1.56 billion to various charities including the Howard Hughes Medical Institute
 Iain Percy – co-founder of the Andrew Simpson Sailing Foundation which was set up after the death of his best friend Andrew Simpson to facilitate children's access to sailing
 Imran Khan – founder of the Shaukat Khanum Memorial Trust, which was behind the first cancer research institution in Pakistan
 Irwin M. Jacobs – contributed hundreds of millions of dollars to the field of education through donations and grants to schools and organizations
 Isaac Wolfson – managing director of Great Universal Stores
 J. Paul Getty – funded the construction of the Getty Villa, the original Getty Museum, and donated his art collection to it; upon his death, left his fortune to the Getty Museum, which eventually expanded to the Getty Center in Los Angeles 
 J.K. Rowling – President of One Parent Families; advocate for social equity
 James E. Stowers – founder of the Stowers Institute for Medical Research
 James Packer – jointly with his majority-owned company Crown Resorts pledged $200 million over 10 years to support Australian community groups
 Jamie and Karen Phelps Moyer – founded the Moyer Foundation to assist non-profit organizations in raising money for children with serious distress
Jamsetji Tata – founded Tata Group
 Jane Addams – co-founder of the Hull House settlement house in Chicago
 Janet Lacey – English charity director of Christian Aid
 Jeff Bezos - Founder and billionaire of Amazon.com who help homeless and charity like Fred Hutchinson Cancer Research Foundation.
 Jimmy Donaldson ("MrBeast"), a YouTuber and founder of Beast Philanthropy, a YouTube channel known for its charitable videos. Also collaborated in two fundraising challenge events known as Team Trees and Team Seas which aimed to raise $20 million and $30 million USD in return of planting 20 million trees and removing 30 million pounds of trash respectively.
 Joe Blackman – dedicated much of his youth to helping young people start their own businesses
 John Cena – Wrestler, actor, television personality, philanthropist under Make-A-Wish Foundation
 John D. MacArthur – co-founder of the MacArthur Foundation
 John D. Rockefeller – founder of the University of Chicago, Rockefeller University, Central Philippine University, General Education Board, and Rockefeller Foundation
 John D. Rockefeller III – major third-generation Rockefeller philanthropist; founder of the Asia Society (1956), the Population Council (1952) and a reconstituted Japan Society; chairman of the Rockefeller Foundation for 20 years; established the Rockefeller Public Service Awards in 1958
 John D. Rockefeller Jr. – expanded the Rockefeller Foundation and Rockefeller University; bought and then donated the land in Manhattan upon which the United Nations headquarters was built
 John Harvard – one of the founders of Harvard College
 John Peele Clapham (1801–1875) – founder of Salem Chapel, Burley in Wharfedale, a founder of West Park United Reformed Church, Harrogate, founder of various Sunday schools, editor of hymn book.
 John R. Hunting – major contributor to liberal or progressive 527 organizations
 John Studzinski – champion of the homeless and the arts in the UK; founder and owner of the Genesis Foundation
 Johns Hopkins – founder of the Johns Hopkins University and the Johns Hopkins Hospital
 John Smith - British banker who paid for the building of St Matthias' Church, Burley and other causes.
 Jon Bon Jovi – American rock star; founder of The Jon Bon Jovi Soul Foundation in 2006
 Joseph Rowntree – founder of the four Rowntree trusts
 Joseph Vijay Chandrasekhar — Indian actor, singer and dancer known for his humanitarianism
 Juana Ross Edwards (1830-1913), Chilean philanthropist
 Juliette Gordon Low – founder of the Girl Scouts of the USA in 1912 in Savannah, Georgia
 Julius Curtis Lewis, Jr. – made an estimated lifetime donations of US$130 million to various civic, spiritual; charitable organizations, many in Savannah, Georgia
 Kenneth C. Griffin – founder and CEO of Citadel LLC; co-founder of the Kenneth and Anne Griffin Foundation
 Kumar Mangalam Birla – As per the EdelGive Hurun India Philanthropy List 2021, Kumar Mangalam Birla and his family ranked fourth on the philanthropy list with donations mostly to the healthcare sector.
 Lady Gaga – founder of the Born This Way Foundation, a charity started in 2011
 Larry Ellison – pledged to give more than half the value of his stock in Oracle Corporation to the Bill and Melinda Gates Foundation
 Levi Strauss – gave to many notable foundations of his time; gave to many Jewish synagogues and organizations
 Li Ka-shing – founder and chairman of the Li Ka Shing Foundation, which focuses on capacity empowerment through education and building of a caring society through medical and healthcare related projects; in 2006, pledged to donate one-third of his fortune estimated at over US$10 billion to philanthropic projects
 Linus Pauling – donated time and effort and spent personal funds to bring about the worldwide ban on above-ground nuclear weapons testing
 Lucia Hou – awarded the 2018 Woman of Year internationally by World Class Beauty Queen for her philanthropy work around the world
 Lucy Salisbury Doolittle – American philanthropist
 Luka Ćelović – benefactor of Serbian education
 Madonna – founder of Ray of Light Foundation (1998), and Raising Malawi (2006), have donated to and advocated for numerous organizations and causes
 Mahesh Babu – In addition to being an actor, he is a humanitarian and philanthropist – he runs a charitable trust and non-profit organisation, Heal-a-Child. He is also associated with Rainbow Hospitals as their goodwill ambassador.
 Marc Benioff – created the 1-1-1 model of integrated corporate philanthropy, by which companies contribute 1 percent of equity, 1 percent of employee hours, and 1 percent of product back to the community
 Marian Tompson – co-founder of La Leche League International, a breastfeeding support organization
 Mariah Carey – Police Athletic League of New York City, Obstetrics, NewYork-Presbyterian Hospital, World Food Programme, LGBT community, America: A Tribute to Heroes, Kosovo, Live 8 concert, London, Hurricane Katrina, Just Stand Up!, Stand Up to Cancer, The Fresh Air Fund, and China Covid-19
 Mark Zuckerberg – co-founder of social media network Facebook
 Marija Trandafil – benefactor of education, medicine and welfare in Novi Sad
 Mary Fels (1863-1953) - founder of Joseph Fels International Commission
 Mary Lee Ware – principal sponsor of the Harvard Museum of Natural History's famous Glass Flowers exhibit; a key player in the creation of the New Hampshire Rhododendron State Park
 Mary Louise Milliken Childs – builder of the Milliken Memorial Community House, the first privately donated community house in America
 Melinda Gates – co-founder of the Bill & Melinda Gates Foundation 
 Metallica – All Within My Hands Foundation, dedicated to creating sustainable communities by supporting workforce education, the fight against hunger, and other critical local services. They also donate a portion of ticket sales in every city visited a local charity (predominantly food banks)
 Michael Bloomberg – donations include over US$1.1 billion to Johns Hopkins University
 Michael Dell – established the Michael and Susan Dell Foundation, which focuses on grants, urban education, childhood health, and family economic stability
 Michael Jackson – donated more than US$500 million to various foundations and won numerous awards for his humanitarianism; founded the Heal the World Foundation
 Michelle Dilhara – Sri Lankan actress 
 Milton Hershey – founder of West Heath School
 Mir Osman Ali Khan – the 7th Nizam of Hyderabad who donated 5000kgs of Gold to India and many donations to Temples, churches and other educations institutions.
 Miša Anastasijević – philanthropist of the 19th century Serbia
Mohammed bin Rashid Al Maktoum – founder of the Mohammed bin Rashid Global Initiatives, a grouping of some 33 charities, awards and philanthropic entities.
 Mr. T – actor; motivational speaker; donated all his gold to charity

 Nikola Spasić – Serbian philanthropist.
 Nita Ambani – Reliance Foundation is an Indian philanthropic initiative founded in 2010 by Nita Ambani. Reliance Industries is a patron of the organization.
 Nicholas M. Butler – president of the Carnegie Endowment for International Peace, 1925-1945
 Oprah Winfrey – estimated donations above US$300 million, and founder of Oprah's Angel Network
 P. K. Subban – Canadian ice hockey player; donated $10 million to the Montreal Children's Hospital
 Paul Mellon – major benefactor of arts and education; co-founder of the Andrew W. Mellon Foundation
 Paul Newman – founder of Newman's Own and the Hole in the Wall Gang Camp for seriously ill children; major donations to other charities
 Paul Walker – founder of the charity Reach Out Worldwide
 Peter Cooper – set up a free college in New York City to help poor people ambitious to improve themselves; Thomas Edison was an early alum
 Petra Němcová – Czech supermodel; founder of the Happy Hearts Fund
 Phil Knight – co-founder of Nike, Inc.; supporter of Oregon Health & Science University, Stanford University and the University of Oregon
 Prince Al-Waleed bin Talal – chairman of investment firm Kingdom Holding Company; pledged US$32bn donation to his philanthropy organization Alwaleed Philanthropies
 Prince Karim Aga Khan IV – founder and chairman of the Aga Khan Development Network which focuses on health, education, culture, rural development, institution-building and the promotion of economic development
 Princess Bernice Pauahi – left properties to the education of Hawaiian boys and girls in what is now Kamehameha Schools
 Ramzan Chhipa, a Pakistani philanthropist and social worker and Chairman of Chhipa Welfare Association based in Karachi, Pakistan
 Ratan Tata – founder of Sir Ratan Tata Trust and chairman of Tata Trust 
 Raymond and Ruth Perelman – parents of Ronald O. Perelman; in 2011 donated $225 million to the University of Pennsylvania Medical School, the largest donation in that university's history
 Richard Desmond – President of the Norwood Charity; raised around £14m for charitable causes with the RD Crusaders; helped build the Richard Desmond Children's Eye Centre part of Moorfields Eye Hospital
 Richard Ellis (mayor) – self-made man and property developer, who gifted his town its Jubilee Memorial and paid for other town needs.
 Rizwan Hussain – barrister, television presenter, international humanitarian worker; former Hindi music singer and producer; known for presenting Islamic and charity shows on Channel S and Islam Channel
 Robert Bass – large donations with wife Ann to Yale University, including the building of the Bass Library at Yale, and numerous other groups including the Brookings Institution, Duke University and Stanford University where Mr. Bass is on the board of trustees. 
 Rohini Nilekani – Nilekani is also a philanthropist and pledged 50 crores to Ashoka Trust for Research in Ecology and the Environment (ATREE).
 Ronald O. Perelman – largest Revlon stockholder; has donated over $200 million to various causes since 2001, including a $50 million gift to create the Ronald O. Perelman Heart Institute at New York-Presbyterian Hospital and Weill Cornell Medical Center; signed the Gates-Buffett Pledge in August 2010, committing up to half his assets to be designated for the benefit of charitable causes (after his family and children have been provided for)
 Ruth Pfau – head of the Marie Adelaide Leprosy Centre in Pakistan; as a result of her efforts, the World Health Organization declared leprosy a controlled disease in Pakistan in 1996
Sainsbury family – founders of Sainsbury's, the UK's large supermarket chain and the Sainsbury Family Charitable Trusts
 Samuel Morley MP – founded Morley College, London; endowed other institutions and causes
 Sava Tekelija – benefactor of scientific education
 Sean Parker – donated $600 million to launch the Parker Foundation, which focuses on three areas: Life Sciences, Global Public Health and Civic Engagement; and donated $250 million to create the Parker Institute for Cancer Immunotherapy
 Shah Rukh Khan – the only Indian to receive UNESCO Pyramide con Marni award for his charity work in 2011
 Shakira – founder of Pies Descalzos Foundation
 Sheema Kermani, a Pakistani social activist (Culture, Women's rights, Peace), the founder of Tehrik-e-Niswan Cultural Action Group (Women's Movement)
 Shiv Nadar – Shiv Nadar has committed more than $1 billion to philanthropy.
 Sidney Myer – founder of the Australian Department store chain Myer
 Sir Charles Henry de Soysa – Ceylonese entrepreneur who pioneered a multitude of medical, educational, religious and infrastructure projects
 Steve Shirley- IT entrepreneur, autism venture philanthropist, founding funder Oxford Internet Institute, UK National Ambassador for Philanthropy 2009/10
 Sir Cliff Richard – one of the vice-presidents of Tearfund, a British religious, relief and development agency; supports The Hunger Project, Kidney Research UK, Roy Castle Lung Cancer Foundation, Teenage Cancer Trust, Cliff Richard Tennis Foundation, Alzheimer's Research UK; opened two new purpose-built buildings for Self Unlimited, a national charity for people with learning disabilities
 Sir David Robinson – founder of the Robinson Charitable Trust and Robinson College
 Sir Ganesh Dutt – longest-serving minister in British Empire who gave all his earnings to charitable works, especially education
 Sir Run Run Shaw – founder of the Shaw Prize Foundation
 Stanoje Petrović – helped fund churches in Serbia.
Stephan Schmidheiny – investor, philanthropist and advocate of sustainable development, founder of non-profits Viva Trust and Fundación Avina
 Steve Wozniak – provided the money, and some technical support, for technology program for the Los Gatos School district; co-founder of Apple Computer (now Apple Inc.)
 Sudha Murthy – Murty's Infosys Foundation is a public charitable trust founded in 1996
 Sunil Bharti Mittal – set up Bharti Foundation which runs schools for 30,000 underprivileged children in rural India
 Suriya – Suriya and his family has also extended help towards the education of Sri Lankan Tamil children on behalf of the Sivakumar Charitable Trust. He is also an active participant in other humanitarian works such as "Save The Tigers" campaign, which aids in the protection and preservation of Tigers in India, and "REACH", a non-profit that cures TB patients for free using supervised medication programs. The actor celebrates every birthday by doing charity work across Tamil Nadu.
 Tarek Ben Halim – investment banker and founder of Alfanar in 2004, the first Venture philanthropy organization with a special focus on the Arab world
 Thomas Holloway – Victorian patent medicine entrepreneur and founder of Royal Holloway, University of London
 Ty Pennington – host of ABC's Extreme Makeover: Home Edition; advocate of doing good towards others in need and to those who give of themselves for the sake of others
 Usher Raymond – American singer/songwriter; founding Chairman of the New Look Foundation; advocate for social justice
 Vernon Hill – founder of Commerce Bank and President of Metro Bank; donated $10m to the Penns School of Veterinary Medicine
 Vijay Eswaran – founder of RYTHM foundation and Q NET
 Virginia Weiffenbach Kettering – Dayton, Ohio's leading philanthropist and patron of the arts
 Vitalik Buterin - co-founder of Ethereum. On 12 May 2021, he donated $1 billion worth of the cryptocurrencies Shiba Inu and Ether to a COVID-19 relief fund in India.
 Wallace Rasmussen – American philanthropist and proponent of higher education
 Warren Buffett – pledged US$30.7 billion worth of Berkshire Hathaway stock to the Bill and Melinda Gates Foundation
 Werner Reinhart – industrialist, philanthropist, music and literature patron
 Weston family – founders of Loblaw food and drug retailer, a real estate investment trust Choice, Weston Foods and Weston Family Foundation
 William Allen – founded and endowed many institutions and causes including 'Schools of Industry' at Lindfield and Newington Academy for Girls
 William Gott – British industrialist and benefactor to churches, museums and civic buildings
 William Henry Vanderbilt – co-founder of the Metropolitan Opera
 William Morris, 1st Viscount Nuffield – donor of 1,700 Both respirators to hospitals, founder of the Nuffield Foundation and Nuffield College, Oxford
 William Wilberforce – English politician; headed successful parliamentary campaign against the British slave trade; later supported the campaign for complete abolition
 Yusuf Islam (also known as Cat Stevens) – founder of Islamic schools, Muslim Aid and Small Kindness
 Zerbanoo Gifford – Founder of the ASHA Foundation. President of the World Zoroastrian Organisation.

Greatest philanthropists by amount of USD
The following table orders the greatest philanthropists by the estimated amount given to charity, corresponding to USD.

See also

 List of wealthiest charitable foundations
 Charitable organization
 Development charities
 Foundation (nonprofit)
 Non-profit organization
 Volunteer
 Volunteerism
 For a longer list of philanthropists, see :Category: Philanthropists.

References

Further reading
 Grimm, Robert T. Notable American Philanthropists: Biographies of Giving and Volunteering (2002) excerpt